Sergio Arribas Calvo (born 30 September 2001) is a Spanish professional footballer who plays as a central midfielder for Real Madrid Castilla.

Club career
Born in Madrid, Arribas joined Real Madrid's La Fábrica in 2012, after representing CD Leganés and CDE Benito Pérez Galdós. In September 2020, after helping the under-20s win the UEFA Youth League, he was promoted to the reserves in Segunda División B.

Arribas made his first team – and La Liga – debut on 20 September 2020, coming on as a late substitute for Vinícius Júnior in a 0–0 away draw against Real Sociedad. His Champions League debut came on 9 December 2020 as a substitute, in a 2–0 victory over Borussia Mönchengladbach. He scored his first goal for the first team on 8 February 2023, in a 4–1 win against Al Ahly in the 2022 FIFA Club World Cup.

Club statistics

Honours
Real Madrid
FIFA Club World Cup: 2022

Real Madrid Juvenil A
UEFA Youth League: 2019–20

References

External links
Real Madrid profile

2001 births
Living people
Footballers from Madrid
Spanish footballers
Association football midfielders
La Liga players
Real Madrid CF players
Segunda División B players
Primera Federación players
Real Madrid Castilla footballers